Everettville is an unincorporated community in Monongalia County, West Virginia, United States. Everettville had a post office, which closed on November 2, 2002.

On April 30, 1927, an explosion at the Federal No. 3 Coal Mine in Everettville caused the death of approximately 111 coal miners, a disaster that ranks among the deadliest coal mine accidents in United States history.

Legendary college football coach John McKay was born in Everettville.

References

Unincorporated communities in Monongalia County, West Virginia
Unincorporated communities in West Virginia